Šipkovica is a village in the municipality of Tetovo, North Macedonia. Its FIPS code was MK91.

Demographics
According to the 2021 census, the village had a total of 1.540 inhabitants. Ethnic groups in the village include:

Albanians 1.483
Others 57

References

External links

Villages in Tetovo Municipality
Albanian communities in North Macedonia